An outdoor sculpture of José de San Martín by Pedro Buigues is installed at Hermann Park's McGovern Centennial Gardens in Houston, Texas, in the United States. The memorial, acquired in 1983, has bronze bust and a granite pedestal.

See also
 List of public art in Houston

References

Bronze sculptures in Texas
Busts in Texas
Cultural depictions of José de San Martín
Granite sculptures in Texas
Hermann Park
Monuments and memorials in Texas
Outdoor sculptures in Houston
Sculptures of men in Texas
Statues of heads of government
Statues of military officers